The following is a partial list of the noteworthy parks in and around the city of İzmir, Turkey. Also indicated are the names of İzmir metropolitan districts where each park is located, as well as the neighborhood, approximate in some cases, where each park is found.

Major Parks
 Kültürpark – Alsancak, Konak
 Aşık Veysel Rekreasyon Alanı (Aşık Veysel Recreational Area) - Bornova
 Yedi Göller, Buca (Seven Lakes) – İzkent, Buca
 Buca Gölet (Buca Pond) – Kaynaklar, Buca
 Turkuvaz Park – İnciraltı, Balçova

Large Urban Parks
 Büyük Park (Greater Park) – Bornova
 Küçük Park (Smaller Park) – Bornova
 Hasanağa Bahçesi – Buca
 Çamkıran Park – Bornova
 Osman Bey Park – Karşıyaka
 Hürriyet Parkı (Liberty Park) – Bahçelievler, Konak
 Yeşil Vadi Parkı (Green Valley Park) – Halilrıfatpaşa, Konak
 Gözlüklü Martı Parkı (Bespectacled Seagull Park) – Üçkuyular, Konak
 Güzel Sanatlar Parkı (Fine Arts Park) – Üçkuyular, Konak
 Adnan Süvari Park – Göztepe, Konak
 Adnan Kahveci Park – Yeşilyurt, Konak
 Susuzdede Parkı – Göztepe, Konak

Nature Parks
 İzmir Doğal Yaşam Parkı (Park of Natural Life) – Sasalı, Çiğli

Izmir